The Ike Skelton Bridge is a set of girder bridges on Route 13 over the Missouri River at Lexington, Missouri between Ray County and Lafayette County.

It opened on June 25, 2005.  It is named for Lexington native, Congressman Ike Skelton. Senate Bill 233 in Missouri also named the new Christopher S. Bond Bridge in Hermann, Missouri over the river as well as section of Interstate 44 in Phelps County for former Governor Mel Carnahan.

The bridge is two miles east of the former Lexington Bridge. It is three-quarters-of-a-mile long and 78 feet wide. Its design includes two 12-foot lanes in each direction and two 10-foot outside shoulders and two 4-foot inside shoulders.  It cost $50 million.

See also
List of crossings of the Missouri River

References
MODOT press release
Missouri Lt. Governor Press Release

Buildings and structures in Ray County, Missouri
Buildings and structures in Lafayette County, Missouri
Bridges completed in 2005
Road bridges in Missouri
Girder bridges in the United States